David Harrington (born 9 October 1953 from Christchurch) is a former professional darts player from New Zealand who's currently in British Darts Organisation events. he was nicknamed Harry.

Career
He qualified for the 2013 PDC World Darts Championship by topping the 2012 DPNZ order of merit. He was whitewashed 4-0 in the preliminary round by Haruki Muramatsu of Japan, averaging just 59.36.

World Championship Results

PDC
 2013: Last 72: (lost to Haruki Muramatsu 0–4) (legs)

References

External links
Profile at Darts Database

Living people
New Zealand darts players
1953 births
Professional Darts Corporation associate players